The University of Missouri College of Arts and Science (A&S) is the liberal arts and sciences unit of the University of Missouri in Columbia, Missouri. Established in 1841, the college is currently the largest unit at MU in terms of the number of students enrolled and the largest academic division in the state of Missouri. The college encompasses a 32 departments, programs, and schools, including the University of Missouri School of Music The college is located in 60 buildings throughout the main campus of the university; The headquarters is located in Lowry Hall on 9th Street.

Departments
The 32 departments at the college are:

Aerospace Studies
Anthropology
Architectural Studies
Biological Sciences
Black Studies
Canadian Studies
Chemistry
Chinese Studies
Classics, Archeology, and Religion
Communication
Economics
English
General Studies
History
Interdisciplinary Studies
International Studies
Japanese Studies
Korean Studies
Linguistics
Mathematics
Military Science and Leadership
Office of Multidisciplinary Degrees
Peace Studies
Philosophy
Physics and Astronomy
Psychological Sciences
School of Languages, Literatures, and Cultures
School of Music
School of Visual Studies
Sociology
South Asian Studies
Statistics
Textile & Apparel Management
Theatre
Truman School of Government and Public Affairs
Women's and Gender Studies

References

External links
College of Arts and Science
MU School of Music

College of Arts and Science
Liberal arts colleges at universities in the United States
Educational institutions established in 1841
University subdivisions in Missouri